A Musical Affair is the seventh studio album by the classical crossover group Il Divo. Il Divo is a group of four male singers: French pop singer Sébastien Izambard, Spanish baritone Carlos Marín, American tenor David Miller, and Swiss tenor Urs Bühler. The album was released on 5 November 2013, and has the participation of singers such as Barbra Streisand, Nicole Scherzinger, Kristin Chenoweth and Michael Ball, among others.

The album's songs are compiled from famous plays and musicals including The Lion King, The Phantom of the Opera, Les Misérables, West Side Story and Cats, among others. 

The French version of the album A Musical Affair which was published on 24 November 2014, includes duets with French singers; the songs are sung partially or entirely in French.

Recording
The album, produced by Steve Mac, was recorded between Florida, London, Belgium, New York, California, Barcelona, Washington DC and Slovakia in the recording studios of:
Bank Atlantic Center in Fort Lauderdale, Florida
Britannia Row Studios in London, England
ICP Studios in Brussels, Belgium
Madison Square Garden in New York
NightBird Recording Studios in West Hollywood
SARM Studios in London, England
Feel Studies of Barcelona, Spain
Studio 2 of Slovak Radio in Bratislava, Slovakia
Tonopro Studios in Barcelona, Spain
Verizon Center in Washington DC, United States

Track listing

International

French version

Charts

Weekly charts

Year-end charts

Certifications

References

External links

2013 albums
Il Divo albums